The Austria national cricket team is the men's team that represents the Republic of Austria in international cricket. The team is organised by the Austrian Cricket Association, which became an affiliate member of the International Cricket Council (ICC) in 1992 and an associate member in 2017.

The Austria national team made its international debut in 1990, at the European Cricketer Cup in Guernsey. It has since regularly competed in European Cricket Council tournaments, usually in the lower divisions, and also often plays bilateral series against other European sides.

History
Having been played by English gardeners, tradesmen and the expat staff of banks working in Vienna at the end of the 19th century - at which time the Vienna Cricket and Football-Club was founded, cricket disappeared in Austria until after the Second World War, when it was played by British occupying troops on a recreational basis.

The modern era as such began in May 1975, when the Australian Kerry Tattersall introduced the game to his pupils at the Vienna Handelsakademie (commercial academy) where he was teaching English, and formed the Vienna Cricket Club. Early opponents came from the United Nations (United Nations CC) and diplomatic services (Five Continents CC) and these founder clubs survive to this day.

Cricket remains predominantly Viennese-based with eleven of the 18 member clubs being based in Vienna. CC Velden '91 is the oldest non-Viennese club, operating since 1991. The latest addition to the ACA is ASKÖ Steyr CC from Upper-Austria.

2018–present
In April 2018, the ICC decided to grant full Twenty20 International (T20I) status to all its members. Therefore, all Twenty20 matches played between Austria and other ICC members since 1 January 2019 have been a full T20I.

Austria played its first T20I match against Romania on 29 August 2019 during the 2019 Continental Cup in Romania.

International competition 
The Austria national team has participated in a considerable number of international tournaments, including hosting three tournaments since 2000:

2000 ECC (European Cricket Council) Representative Festival (5 teams – Norway, Slovenia, Croatia, Finland and Austria)
2001 ECC Trophy in Seebarn and Velden (10 teams – Sweden, Malta, Portugal, Spain, Switzerland, Greece, Belgium, Austria, Croatia and Finland)
2002 ECC European Cricket Championships, B Division in Northern Ireland (6 teams – Austria, France, Germany, Gibraltar, Israel and Portugal)
2003 ECC Notts Sport Trophy in Seebarn and Markomannenstrasse (11 teams – Malta, Portugal, Spain, Luxembourg, Switzerland, Greece, Belgium, Croatia, Finland, Austria and Norway)

They have been placed in Division Five of the newly expanded European Championship from 2008.

Tournament history

European Cricket Championship
2002 (Division Two): 6th place
2009 (Division Four): 3rd place

Club cricket 
There are three club competitions within Austria: the ACA (Austrian Cricket Association) League, and ACA Trophy (north & south).

The ACA League comprises (in 2006) 14 teams, 10 of which are based in Vienna.
The ACA Trophy sometimes includes teams from outside Austria, for example from Poland and the Czech Republic.

Records

International Match Summary — Austria
 
Last updated 31 July 2022.

Twenty20 International 

 Highest team total: 239/3 v Luxembourg, 31 August 2019 at Moara Vlasiei Cricket Ground, Moara Vlăsiei
 Highest individual score: 111*, Bilal Zalmai v Czech Republic, 1 September 2019 at Moara Vlasiei Cricket Ground, Moara Vlăsiei
 Best individual bowling figures: 5/5, Aqib Iqbal v Belgium, 24 July 2021 at Royal Brussels Cricket Club, Waterloo

Most T20I runs for Austria

Most T20I wickets for Austria

T20I record versus other nations

Records complete to T20I #1714. Last updated 31 July 2022.

See also 
 List of Austria Twenty20 International cricketers
 Austria women's national cricket team
 List of International Cricket Council members

References

External links 
 Austrian Cricket Association
 Cricinfo – Austria
 Afghans' cricket in Austria

Cricket in Austria
National cricket teams
Cricket
Austria in international cricket